McGrath or MacGrath derives from the Irish surname Mac Craith and is occasionally noted with a space: e.g. Izzy Mc Grath. In Ireland, it is pronounced "Ma Grah". In Australia and New Zealand it is pronounced MuhGrah.

Notable people with the surname include:

Clergy
Alister McGrath (born 1953), Anglican theologian
Desmond McGrath, Canadian politician and Catholic priest
Michael McGrath (bishop) (born 1882), Roman Catholic Archbishop of Cardiff, Wales
Patrick Joseph McGrath (born 1945), Roman Catholic Bishop of San Jose, California

Musicians
Eamon McGrath (born 1988), Canadian indie rock musician
Gunner McGrath (born 1978), American vocalist and guitarist
Mark McGrath (born 1968), American rock vocalist

Writers and poets
Campbell McGrath (born 1962), American poet
Eamonn McGrath (1929-2008), Irish novelist
Harold MacGrath (1871–1932), American novelist and screenwriter
Patrick McGrath (novelist) (born 1950), British novelist
Seán mac Ruaidhrí Mac Craith (fl. 14th century), author of Caithréim Thoirdhealbhaigh
Thomas McGrath (poet) (1916–1990), American poet
Wendy McGrath, Canadian poet and novelist

Actors, directors, and screenwriters
Alethea McGrath, Australian actress
Bob McGrath (1932–2022), US actor, known for Sesame Street
Derek McGrath (born 1951), Canadian actor
Douglas McGrath (1958–2022), American screenwriter, director, and actor
Frances McGrath, American actress
Frank McGrath (1903–1967), US actor
Joseph McGrath (born 1930), Scottish film director
Judith McGrath (1947–2017), Australian actress
Katie McGrath (born 1983), Irish actress

Athletes
Andrew McGrath (born 1998), Australian rules footballer
Craig McGrath (rugby union), former New Zealand rugby union player
Felix McGrath (born 1963), former American World Cup alpine skier
Glenn McGrath (born 1970), Australian former cricketer
Jeremy McGrath (born 1971), American Motocross/Supercross champion
John McGrath (English footballer) (1938–1998), English footballer and football manager
Kyle McGrath (born 1992), American baseball player
Marion Mott-McGrath (born 1940), Australian chess player
Mick McGrath (footballer) (born 1936), Irish footballer
Paul McGrath (footballer) (born 1959), Irish former footballer
Robbie McGrath (born 1951), former Irish rugby union international
Sean McGrath (American football) (born 1987), American National Football League player
Tahlia McGrath (born 1995), Australian cricketer
Tim McGrath (born 1970), former Australian rules footballer

Politicians
Amy McGrath, retired US Marine and politician
Charles McGrath (1872–1934), Australian politician
J. Howard McGrath (1903–1966), American politician
James McGrath (Australian politician) (born 1974), Australian senator
James McGrath (Canadian politician) (born 1932), Canadian politician
Joseph McGrath (Irish politician) (1887–1966), Irish politician
Michael A. McGrath (born 1942), American politician
Patrick McGrath (Irish politician) (died 1956), Irish politician
Paul McGrath (politician) (born 1948), Irish politician
William McGrath (1916–1992), Northern Irish Loyalist, convicted paedophile

Others
Elizabeth McGrath (art historian) (born 1945), British art historian and academic
Kevin McGrath, British businessman
Patrick McGrath (Irish republican) (1894-1940)
Patrick McGrath (psychologist), Canadian psychologist
Rae McGrath (born 1947), British campaigner against landmines
Raymond McGrath (1903–1977), British Australian architect
Rory McGrath (born 1956), British comedian
Tom McGrath (media executive) (born 1956), American media expert
William L. McGrath (1894–1975), American business executive
William Thomas McGrath Canadian penologist

See also
Justice McGrath (disambiguation)